Orto may refer to:

 Orto, Corse-du-Sud, a commune on the island of Corsica
 Orto (company), an Estonian publishing company